Dudley Barr McNeil (May 29, 1908 - August 11, 1977) was an American prelate of the Episcopal Church who served as Bishop of Western Michigan between 1953 and 1959.

Biography
McNeil was born on May 29, 1908 in Evanston, Illinois, the son of Walter William McNeil and Emily Barr. He was educated at the Elgin Academy. He also graduated from the Seabury-Western Theological Seminary in 1936. He married Charlotte L. Miller on June 12, 1934 and together had two children.

McNeil was ordained deacon in November 1935 and priest in May 1936 by Bishop George Craig Stewart of Chicago. He initially served as deacon-in-charge of St Lawrence's Church in Libertyville, Illinois, before becoming rector of St Paul's Church in Evanston, Illinois and simultaneously priest-in-charge of the churches in Cokeville, Wyoming and Big Piney, Wyoming between 1937 and 1945. Between 1938 and 1945, he also served as priest-in-charge of the missions in Pinedale, Wyoming and La Barge, Wyoming. Between 1939 and 1945, he also served as priest-in-charge of the missions in Bondurant, Wyoming. In 1945, he was appointed Dean of St Matthew's Cathedral in Laramie, Wyoming, where he served till 1949, after which he became rector of St James' Church in Sault Ste. Marie, Michigan and Dean of the eaatern part of the Diocese of Northern Michigan.

On March 19, 1953, McNeil was elected Bishop of Western Michigan on the second ballot, and was consecrated on July 25, 1953 by Presiding Bishop Henry Knox Sherrill. During the luncheon that followed his consecration, McNeil collapsed and was taken in hospital. He served as bishop till his resignation in on September 1, 1959 due to ill health. He then served as vicar of Holy Communion Church in Lake View, New York. Between 1975 and 1977, he also served as Assistant Bishop in the Diocese of Western New York. He died in August 1977.

References

1908 births
1977 deaths
People from Evanston, Illinois
Seabury-Western Theological Seminary alumni
Episcopal bishops of Western Michigan
20th-century American Episcopalians
20th-century American clergy